Eimeria meleagridis is a species of coccidia found worldwide, which causes mild disease in young turkeys aged 4–8 weeks. The parasite causes disease in the cecum, where, on post-mortem examination (necropsy), a cream-colored exudate is seen.

References 

Conoidasida